Radhagaon railway station is a small railway station in Bokaro district, Jharkhand. Its code is RDF. It serves Radhagaon area of Bokaro Steel City Industrial area. The station consists of three platforms. The platforms are not well sheltered. It lacks many facilities including water and sanitation.

Major trains 

Some of the important trains that runs from Radhagaon are :

 Bokaro Steel City–Asansol MEMU
 Muri–Dhanbad Passenger (unreserved)
 Dhanbad–Ranchi Passenger (unreserved)
 Jhargram–Dhanbad MEMU
 Hatia–Barddhaman Passenger (unreserved)
 Asansol–Bokaro Steel City MEMU

See also 
 Bokaro Steel City railway station
 Bokaro Thermal railway station

References

Railway stations in Bokaro district
Adra railway division
Bokaro Steel City